The 2017 Toronto FC II season is the third season in the club's history. In 2016 the team finished 12th in the Eastern Conference, therefore, missing the playoffs.

Roster

Players
As of October 15, 2017.
The squad of Toronto FC II will be composed of an unrestricted number of first-team players on loan to the reserve team, players signed to TFC II, and TFC Academy players. Academy players who appear in matches with TFC II will retain their college eligibility.

Transfers

In

Loan In

Out

Loan Out

Competitions

Preseason

United Soccer League

League table

Eastern Conference

Results summary

Results by round

Matches

Statistics

Squad and statistics

|}

Goals and assists 
Correct as of October 15, 2017

Clean sheets 
Includes all competitive matches.
Correct as of October 15, 2017

Disciplinary record 
Correct as of October 15, 2017

Recognition

USL Team of the Week

USL Goal of the Week

USL Save of the Week

USL Save of the Month

USL Save of the Year

References

External links
 

Toronto FC II seasons
Toronto FC II
Toronto FC II
Toronto FC II